Vladimír Mišinský (born 8 July 1986) is a Czech football player who plays for FC Odra Petřkovice.

Career
Mišinský started his career at Baník Ostrava. Ahead of the 2019–20 season, Mišinský joined FC Odra Petřkovice.

References

External links
 
 
 

Czech footballers
Czech Republic youth international footballers
Czech Republic under-21 international footballers
1986 births
Living people
Czech First League players
Czech National Football League players
FC Baník Ostrava players
MFK Karviná players
FC Hradec Králové players
FC Hlučín players
FK Frýdek-Místek players
MFK Vítkovice players
Association football midfielders